Sir Edward John Gambier (1794–1879) was a colonial jurist and law officer, who served as a judge in British India, Chief Justice of Madras and Recorder of Penang, Singapore, Malacca.

Gambier, the third son of Sir Samuel Gambier, first commissioner of the navy (1752–1813), by Jane, youngest daughter of Daniel Mathew of Felix Hall, Essex, and nephew of Admiral James Gambier, 1st Baron Gambier, was born in 1794. He entered Eton College in 1808, when he went up to Trinity College, Cambridge, where he took his bachelor's degree in 1817.  He was the first President of the Cambridge Union; and was awarded ninth senior optime, and junior chancellor's medallist; he proceeded M.A. in 1820, and became a fellow of his college.

Edward Gambier was called to the bar at Lincoln's Inn 7 February 1822, and acted as one of the municipal corporation commissioners in 1833. The recordership of Prince of Wales Island was conferred on him in 1834, and he was knighted by William IV at St. James's Palace on 6 August in that year.

He was removed to Madras 28 November 1836 as a puisne judge of the supreme court, and raised to the chief justiceship there 11 March 1842, being sworn in on 22 May. The duties of this high post he discharged with ability and efficiency until his retirement in 1849, when he received from the Hindu community of Madras a testimonial consisting of a silver centre-piece weighing 550 ounces, and Lady Gambier was at the same time presented with a handsome tripod centrepiece by the European ladies of Madras.

A Treatise on Parochial Settlement, which he published in 1828, went to a second edition under the editorship of J. Greenwood in 1835.

He died at 22 Hyde Park Gate, Kensington, London, 31 May 1879, in his eighty-sixth year. He married in 1828 Emilia Ora, daughter of C. Morgell, M.P.; she died on 25 February 1877.

Notes

References
 

1794 births
1879 deaths
People educated at Eton College
Alumni of Trinity College, Cambridge
Members of Lincoln's Inn
19th-century English judges
Chief Justices of the Madras High Court
British India judges
Presidents of the Cambridge Union